Coldwater Canyon is a canyon running perpendicular to and over the central Santa Monica Mountains, in Los Angeles County, California, United States.

A section of the canyon south of Mulholland Drive is also a neighborhood in the Beverly Crest Neighborhood Council of the City of Los Angeles.

Geography
The canyon is traversed via Coldwater Canyon Drive and Coldwater Canyon Avenue (linked by a short section of Mulholland Drive), which connects the city of Beverly Hills and the Westside, with the Studio City neighborhood and the San Fernando Valley.

See also
Neighborhoods in Los Angeles, California

Canyons and gorges of California
Santa Monica Mountains
Landforms of Los Angeles County, California
Geography of Los Angeles
San Fernando Valley
Neighborhoods in Los Angeles
Populated places in the Santa Monica Mountains
Beverly Crest, Los Angeles
Beverly Hills, California
Studio City, Los Angeles
Streets in Los Angeles County, California